Turkey has an emerging market economy, as defined by the International Monetary Fund. The country is a founding member of the OECD (1961) and the G-20 major economies (1999). Since 1995, Turkey is a party to the European Union–Turkey Customs Union. Turkey is often classified as a newly industrialized country by economists and political scientists; while Merrill Lynch, the World Bank, the IMF and The Economist magazine describe Turkey as an emerging market economy. Turkey is one of the Emerging 7 countries. The World Bank classifies Turkey as an upper-middle income country in terms of the country's per capita GDP. The CIA World Factbook adds Turkey to its list of developed countries (DCs) due to the country's status as a founding member of the OECD. With a population of 85.3 million as of 2022, The position of Turkey in the United Nation's Human Development Index is also in the list of developed countries, Turkey's Human Development Index value is 0.838, usually those countries above the Human Development Index value 0.800 are considered developed countries. Turkey is among the world's leading producers of agricultural products, textiles, motor vehicles, transportation equipment, construction materials, consumer electronics and home appliances.

Turkey's nominal GDP peaked at $957.5 billion in 2013, ranking 16th in the world in that year, while its nominal GDP per capita peaked at $12,489 in 2013, ranking 64th. The GDP (PPP) per capita peaked at $38,759 in 2022, ranking 46th. The declining value of the Turkish lira, especially during the 2018–2022 Turkish currency and debt crisis, had a significant impact on the recent decrease in the country's USD-based nominal GDP figures. High inflation continues to be a problem in the early 2020s. According to the IMF's estimates, published in the IMF WEO Database of October 2022, Turkey is forecasted to have the world's 20th-largest nominal GDP and 11th-largest GDP by PPP by the end of 2022.

Over the past 20 years, there have been major developments in the financial and social aspects of Turkey's economy, such as increases in employment and average income since 2000. Turkey has recently slowed down in its economic progress, due to considerable changes in external and internal factors, as well as a reduction in the government's economic reforms. Environmentalists have argued that the economy is excessively dependent on the construction and contracting sector. President Recep Tayyip Erdoğan's unorthodox monetary policy increased inflation and devalued the currency in recent years.

Macroeconomic trends

According to Eurostat data, Turkish GDP per capita adjusted by purchasing power standards stood at 64% of the EU average in 2018. Turkey's labour force participation rate of 61.5% is by far the lowest of the OECD states which have a median rate of 78%. 2017 was the second consecutive year that saw more than 5.000 high net-worth individuals (HNWIs, defined as holding net assets of at least $1 million) leaving Turkey, reasons given as government crackdown on the media deterring investment, and loss of currency value against the U.S. dollar.

A longstanding characteristic of the Turkish economy is a low savings rate. Since under the government of Recep Tayyip Erdoğan, Turkey has been running huge and growing current account deficits, reaching $7.1 billion by January 2018, while the rolling 12-month deficit rose to $51.6 billion, one of the largest current account deficits in the world. The economy has relied on capital inflows to fund private-sector excess, with Turkey's banks and big firms borrowing heavily, often in foreign currency. Under these conditions, Turkey must find about $200 billion a year to fund its wide current account deficit and maturing debt, always at risk of inflows drying up, having gross foreign currency reserves of just $85 billion.

Turkey has been meeting the "60% Maastricht criteria" of the EU for government debt stock since 2004. Similarly, from 2002 to 2011, the budget deficit decreased from more than 10% to less than 3%, which is one of the EU's Maastricht criteria for the budget balance. In January 2010, International credit rating agency Moody's Investors Service upgraded Turkey's rating one notch. In 2012, credit ratings agency Fitch upgraded Turkey's credit rating to investment grade after an 18-year gap, followed by a ratings upgrade by credit ratings agency Moody's Investors Service in May 2013, as the service lifted Turkey's government bond ratings to the lowest investment grade, Moody's first investment-grade rating for Turkey in two decades and the service stated in its official statement that the nation's "recent and expected future improvements in key economic and public finance metrics" was the basis for the ratings boost. In March 2018, Moody's downgraded Turkey's sovereign debt into junk status, warning of an erosion of checks and balances under Recep Tayyip Erdoğan. In May 2018, credit ratings agency Standard & Poor's cut Turkey's debt rating further into junk territory, citing widening concern about the outlook for inflation amid a sell-off in the Turkish lira currency.

Share prices in Turkey nearly doubled over the course of 2009. On 10 May 2017, the Borsa Istanbul (BIST-100 Index), the benchmark index of Turkey's stock market, set a new record high at 95,735 points. As of 5 January 2018, the Index reached 116,638 points. However, in the course of the 2018 Turkish currency and debt crisis, the index dipped back below 100.000 in May. In early June, the BIST-100 Index dropped to the lowest level in dollar terms since the global financial crisis in 2008.

In 2017, the OECD expected Turkey to be one of the fastest growing economies among OECD members during 2015–2025, with an annual average growth rate of 4.9%. In May 2018, Moody's Investors Service lowered its estimate for growth of the Turkish economy in 2018 from 4% to 2.5% & in 2019 from 3.5% to 2%.

According to a 2013 Financial Times Special Report on Turkey, Turkish business executives and government officials believed the quickest route to achieving export growth lies outside of traditional western markets. While the European Union used to account for more than half of all Turkey's exports, by 2013 the figure was heading down toward not much more than a third. However, by 2018 the share of exports going to the EU was back above fifty percent. Turkish companies’ foreign direct investment outflow has increased by 10 times over the past 15 years, according to the 2017 Foreign Investment Index.

With policies of Recep Tayyip Erdoğan fuelling the construction sector, where many of his business allies are active, Turkey as of May 2018 had around 2 million unsold houses, a backlog worth three times average annual new housing sales. The 2018 Turkish currency and debt crisis ended a period of growth under Erdoğan-led governments since 2003, built largely on a construction boom fueled by easy credit and government spending.

In 2018, Turkey went through a currency and debt crisis, characterised by the Turkish lira (TRY) plunging in value, high inflation, rising borrowing costs, and correspondingly rising loan defaults. The crisis was caused by the Turkish economy's excessive current account deficit and foreign-currency debt, in combination with the ruling Justice and Development Party's (AKP) increasing authoritarianism and President Erdoğan's unorthodox ideas about interest rate policy.

On 10 August 2018, Turkish currency lira nosedived following Donald Trump's tweet about doubling tariffs on Turkish steel and aluminum that day. The currency weakened 17% that day and has lost nearly 40% of its value against the dollar till that time. The crash of the lira has sent ripples through global markets, putting more pressure on the euro and increasing investors' risk aversion to emerging-market currencies across the board. On 13 Aug., South Africa's rand slumped nearly 10%, the biggest daily drop since June 2016. Lira crisis spotlighted deeper concerns about the Turkish economy that have long signaled turmoil long ago.

By the end of 2018, Turkey went into recession. The Turkish Statistical Institute claimed that the Turkish economy declined by 2.4% in the last quarter of 2018 as compared to the previous quarter. This followed a 1.6% drop the previous quarter. Lira shrank down to 30% against the US dollar in 2018.

In May 2019, European Bank for Reconstruction and Development (EBRD) released an economic outlook in which it is reported that Turkey's economy will probably see a gradual recovery of growth to around 2.5 percent in 2020.

According to official data in December 2022, Turkey's annual inflation rate rose to a 24-year high of 85.51% in October. This was slightly below expectations after the central bank cut interest rates despite rising prices. Inflation has surged since the lira collapsed last year after the central bank began cutting rates in an easing cycle long sought by President Tayyip Erdogan.

Data 

The following table shows the main economic indicators from 1980 to 2021 (with IMF staff estimates in 2022–2027). Inflation below 10% is in green.

Main economic sectors

Agricultural sector

Industrial sector

Consumer electronics and home appliances

Turkey's Vestel is the largest TV producer in Europe, accounting for a quarter of all TV sets manufactured and sold on the continent in 2006. By January 2005, Vestel and its rival Turkish electronics and white goods brand Beko accounted for more than half of all TV sets manufactured in Europe. Another Turkish electronics brand, Profilo Telra, was Europe's third-largest TV producer in 2005. EU market share of Turkish companies in consumer electronics has increased significantly following the Customs Union agreement signed between the EU and Turkey: in color TVs from 5% in 1995 to more than 50% in 2005, in digital devices from 3% to 15%, and in white goods from 3% to 18%.

Textiles and clothing
Turkish companies made clothing exports worth $13.98 billion in 2006; more than $10.67 billion of which (76.33%) were exported to EU member states.

Vakko, Beymen, Yargıcı, Mavi Jeans, Ipekyol, Les Benjamins, Colin's, Nocturne, LC Waikiki, Derimod, DESA and Koton are some of the biggest fashion brands in Turkey.

Motor vehicles and automotive products

The automotive industry in Turkey, which plays an important role in the manufacturing sector of the Turkish economy, produced 1,276,140 motor vehicles in 2021, ranking as the 13th largest producer in the world (production peaked at 1,695,731 motor vehicles in 2017, when Turkey also ranked 13th). Turkish automotive companies like TEMSA, Otokar and BMC are among the world's largest van, bus and truck manufacturers. Togg, or Turkey's Automobile Joint Venture Group Inc. is the first all-electric vehicle company of Turkey.

The automotive industry is an important part of the economy since the late 1960s. The companies that operate in the sector are mainly located in the Marmara Region. With a cluster of car-makers and parts suppliers, the Turkish automotive sector has become an integral part of the global network of production bases, exporting over $22.94 billion worth of motor vehicles and components in 2008.

Global car manufacturers with production plants include Fiat/Tofaş, Oyak-Renault, Hyundai, Toyota, Honda and Ford/Otosan. Turkish automotive companies like TEMSA, Otokar and BMC are among the world's largest van, bus and truck manufacturers. Togg is a new Turkish automotive company established in 2018 for producing EVs. Togg's factory in Gemlik, Bursa Province, was inaugurated on October 29, 2022, the 99th anniversary of the Turkish Republic.

Turkey's annual auto exports, including trucks and buses, surpassed 1 million units for the first time in 2016 as foreign automakers' investment in new models and a recovery in its mainstay European market lifted shipments. According to industry group the Automotive Manufacturers Association, or OSD, Turkey exported 1.14 million units in 2016, up 15% from the year before. Auto exports hit a record high for the fourth straight year. Production grew 9% year on year in 2016 to 1.48 million units, setting a new record for the second consecutive year. Nearly 80% of vehicles produced in Turkey were exported.

Multiple unit trains, locomotives and wagons
TÜLOMSAŞ (1894), TÜVASAŞ (1951) and EUROTEM (2006) are among the major producers of multiple unit trains, locomotives and wagons in Turkey, including high-speed EMU and DMU models.

Bozankaya is a Turkish manufacturer of rolling stock including metro, tram and trolleybus vehicles in Ankara.

Defense industry

Turkey has many modern armament manufacturers. Annual exports reached $1.6 billion in 2014. MKEK, TAI, Aselsan, Roketsan, FNSS, Nurol Makina, Otokar, and Havelsan are major manufacturers. On 11 July 2002, Turkey became a Level 3 partner of the F-35 Joint Strike Fighter (JSF) development program. TAI builds various aircraft types and models, such as the F-16 Fighting Falcon for the Turkish Air Force. Turkey has recently launched domestically built new military/intelligence satellites including a 0.8m resolution reconnaissance satellite (Project Göktürk-1) for use by the Turkish Armed Forces and a 2m resolution reconnaissance satellite (Project Göktürk-2) for use by the Turkish National Intelligence Organization.

Other important products include the TAI TF-X, TF2000-class destroyer, Milgem class corvette, Baykar MIUS Kızılelma UCAV, Baykar Akıncı HALE UCAV, Baykar Bayraktar TB2 MALE UCAV, TAI Aksungur MALE UCAV, TAI Anka MALE UAV/UCAV, Aselsan İzci UGV, Altay main battle tank, T-155 Fırtına self-propelled howitzer, J-600T missile, T-129 attack helicopter, A400M, Roketsan UMTAS anti-tank missile, Roketsan Cirit laser-guided rocket, Panter howitzer, ACV-300, Otokar Cobra and Akrep, BMC Kirpi, FNSS Pars 6x6 and 8x8 APC, Nurol Ejder 6x6 APC, TOROS artillery rocket system, Bayraktar Mini UAV, ASELPOD, and SOM cruise missile.

Steel-Iron industry
Turkey ranks 8th in the list of countries by steel production. In 2013, total steel production was 29 million tonnes.
Turkey's crude steel production reached a record high of 34.1 million tons in 2011.
Notable producers (above 2 million tonnes) and their ranks among top steel producing companies.
 Erdemir (7.1 million tonnes) (47th) (Only Erdemir-Turkey; Erdemir-Romania is not included)
 Habaş (4.4 million tonnes) (72nd)
 İçdaş (3.6 million tonnes) (76th)
 Diler (2.3 million tonnes) (108th)
 Çolakoğlu (2.1 million tonnes) (110th)

Science and technology

TÜBİTAK is the leading agency for developing science, technology and innovation policies in Turkey. TÜBA is an autonomous scholarly society acting to promote scientific activities in Turkey. TAEK is the official nuclear energy institution of Turkey. Its objectives include academic research in nuclear energy, and the development and implementation of peaceful nuclear tools.

Turkish government companies for research and development in military technologies include Turkish Aerospace Industries, ASELSAN, HAVELSAN, ROKETSAN, MKE, among others. Turkish Satellite Assembly, Integration and Test Center is a spacecraft production and testing facility owned by the Ministry of National Defence and operated by the Turkish Aerospace Industries. The Turkish Space Launch System is a project to develop the satellite launch capability of Turkey. It consists of the construction of a spaceport, the development of satellite launch vehicles as well as the establishment of remote earth stations.

Construction and contracting sector

The Turkish construction and contracting industry is made up of a large number of businesses, the largest of which was ranked 40th in the world by size. In 2016 a total of 39 Turkish construction and contracting companies were listed in the Top 250 International Contractors List prepared by the Engineering News-Record.

Over half of Turkey's building stock contravenes housing regulations. An amnesty program to register illegal constructed buildings brought in $3.1 billion, but the safety issues largely remain. In mid-February 2019, an eight-story building that was registered in the amnesty collapsed killing 21 people. As Turkey is prone to strong earthquakes, poor building quality is even more concerning.

Service sector

Transport

In 2013 there were ninety-eight airports in Turkey, including 22 international airports. , Istanbul Atatürk Airport is the 11th busiest airport in the world, serving 31,833,324 passengers between January and July 2014, according to Airports Council International. The new (third) international airport of Istanbul is planned to be the largest airport in the world, with a capacity to serve 150 million passengers per annum.

The state-owned utility Turkish State Railways operates the 12,740–km railway network, 23rd longest in the world. Since 2003, Turkish State Railways has also been investing in high-speed rail lines, which at 2,175 km (1,353 mi) ranked ninth longest in the world.

As of 2010, the country had a roadway network of 426,951 km, including 2,080 km of expressways and 16,784 km of divided highways.

As of 2010, the Turkish merchant marine included 1,199 ships (604 registered at home), ranking 7th in the world. Turkey's coastline has 1,200 km of navigable waterways.

Communications

As of 2008, there were 17,502,000 operational landline telephones in Turkey, which ranked 18th in the world; while there were 65,824,000 registered mobile phones in the country, which ranked 15th in the world during the same year. The largest landline telephone operator is Türk Telekom, which also owns TTNET, the largest internet service provider in Turkey. The largest mobile phone operators in the country are Turkcell, Vodafone Turkey, Avea and TTNET Mobil.

The telecommunications liberalisation process started in 2004 after the creation of the Telecommunication Authority, and is still ongoing. Private sector companies operate in mobile telephony, long-distance telephony and Internet access. Additional digital exchanges are permitting a rapid increase in subscribers; the construction of a network of technologically advanced intercity trunk lines, using both fiber-optic cable and digital microwave radio relay, is facilitating communication between urban centers.

The remote areas of the country are reached by a domestic satellite system, while the number of subscribers to mobile-cellular telephone service is growing rapidly.

The main line international telephone service is provided by the SEA-ME-WE 3 submarine communications cable and by submarine fiber-optic cables in the Mediterranean Sea and Black Sea that link Turkey with Italy, Greece, Israel, Bulgaria, Romania, and Russia. In 2002, there were 12 Intelsat satellite earth stations; and 328 mobile satellite terminals in the Inmarsat and Eutelsat systems.

Türksat A.Ş. is the primary communications satellite operator of Turkey, controlling the Turksat series of satellites. Göktürk-1, Göktürk-2 and Göktürk-3 are Turkey's earth observation satellites for reconnaissance, operated by the Turkish Ministry of National Defense. BILSAT-1 and RASAT are the scientific observation satellites operated by the TÜBİTAK Space Technologies Research Institute, which (together with Turkish Aerospace Industries and Aselsan) also takes part in the production of Turkey's satellites.

As of 2001, there were 16 AM, 107 FM, and 6 shortwave radio stations in the country.

As of 2015, there were 42,275,017 internet users in Turkey, which ranked 15th in the world; while as of 2012, there were 7,093,000 internet hosts in the country, which ranked 16th in the world.

Tourism

In 2019, Turkey ranked sixth in the world in terms of the number of international tourist arrivals, with 51.2 million foreign tourists visiting the country. Over the years, Turkey has emerged as a popular tourist destination for many Europeans, competing with Greece, Italy and Spain. Resorts in provinces such as Antalya and Muğla (which are located on the Turkish Riviera) have become very popular among tourists.

Banking and finance

The Central Bank of the Republic of Turkey (Türkiye Cumhuriyet Merkez Bankası) was founded in 1930, as a privileged joint-stock company. It possesses the sole right to issue notes. It also has the obligation to provide for the monetary requirements of the state agricultural and commercial enterprises. All foreign exchange transfers are exclusively handled by the central bank.

Originally established as the Ottoman Stock Exchange (Dersaadet Tahvilat Borsası) in 1866, and reorganized to its current structure at the beginning of 1986, the Istanbul Stock Exchange (ISE) is the sole securities market of Turkey. During the 19th and early 20th centuries, Bankalar Caddesi (Banks Street) in Istanbul was the financial center of the Ottoman Empire, where the headquarters of the Ottoman Central Bank (established as the Bank-ı Osmanî in 1856, and later reorganized as the Bank-ı Osmanî-i Şahane in 1863) and the Ottoman Stock Exchange (1866) were located. Bankalar Caddesi continued to be Istanbul's main financial district until the 1990s, when most Turkish banks began moving their headquarters to the modern central business districts of Levent and Maslak. In 1995, the Istanbul Stock Exchange moved to its current building in the Istinye quarter. The Istanbul Gold Exchange was also established in 1995. The stock market capitalisation of listed companies in Turkey was valued at $161,537,000,000 in 2005 by the World Bank.

Until 1991, establishing a private sector bank in Turkey was subject to strict government controls and regulations. On 10 October 1991 (ten days before the general elections of 20 October 1991) the ANAP government of Prime Minister Mesut Yılmaz gave special permissions to five prominent businessmen (who had close links to the government) to establish their own small-scale private banks. These were Kentbank (owned by the Süzer Group); Park Yatırım Bankası (owned by Karamehmet); Toprakbank (owned by Toprak); Bank Ekspres (owned by Betil); and Alternatif Bank (owned by Doğan.) They were followed by other small-scale private banks established between 1994 and 1995, during the DYP government of Prime Minister Tansu Çiller, who introduced drastic changes to the banking laws and regulations; which made it very easy to establish a bank in Turkey, but also opened many loopholes in the system. In 1998, there were 72 banks in Turkey; most of which were owned by construction companies that used them as financial assets for siphoning money into their other operations.

As a result, in 1999 and 2001, the DSP government of Prime Minister Bülent Ecevit had to face two major economic crises that were caused mostly by the weak and loosely regulated banking sector; the growing trade deficit; and the devastating İzmit earthquake of 17 August 1999. The Turkish lira, which was pegged to the U.S. dollar prior to the crisis of 2001, had to be floated, and lost an important amount of its value. This financial breakdown reduced the number of banks to 31. Prime Minister Bülent Ecevit had to call the renowned economist Kemal Derviş to tidy up the economy and especially the weak banking system so that a similar economic crisis would not happen again.

At present, the Turkish banking sector is among the strongest and most expansive in East Europe, the Middle East and Central Asia. During the past decade since 2001, the Turkish lira has also gained a considerable amount of value and maintained its stability, becoming an internationally exchangeable currency once again (in line with the inflation that dropped to single-digit figures since 2003.) The economy grew at an average rate of 7.8% between 2002 and 2005. Fiscal deficit is benefiting (though in a small amount) from large industrial privatizations. Banking came under stress beginning in October 2008 as Turkish banking authorities warned state-run banks against the pullback of loans from the larger financial sectors. More than 34% of the assets in the Turkish banking sector are concentrated in the Agricultural Bank (Ziraat Bankası), Housing Bank (Yapı Kredi Bankası), Isbank (Türkiye İş Bankası) and Akbank. The five big state-owned banks were restructured in 2001. Political involvement was minimized and loaning policies were changed. There are also numerous international banks, which have branches in Turkey. A number of Arabian trading banks, which practice an Islamic banking, are also present in the country.

Government regulations passed in 1929 required all insurance companies to reinsure 30% of each policy with the Millî Reasürans T.A.Ş. (National Reinsurance Corporation) which was founded on 26 February 1929. In 1954, life insurance was exempted from this requirement. The insurance market is officially regulated through the Ministry of Commerce.

After years of low levels of foreign direct investment (FDI), in 2007 Turkey succeeded in attracting $21.9 billion in FDI and is expected to attract a higher figure in following years. A series of large privatizations, the stability fostered by the start of Turkey's EU accession negotiations, strong and stable growth, and structural changes in the banking, retail, and telecommunications sectors have all contributed to the rise in foreign investment. 

In recent years, the chronically high inflation has been brought under control and this has led to the launch of a new currency, the "New Turkish lira", on 1 January 2005, to cement the acquisition of the economic reforms and erase the vestiges of an unstable economy. On 1 January 2009, the New Turkish lira was renamed once again as the "Turkish lira", with the introduction of new banknotes and coins.

Medical tourism 

There are numerous private hospitals in Turkey, which has benefited from medical tourism in recent years. Health tourism generated revenues worth $1 billion in 2019 for Turkey's economy. A total of 662,087 patients were treated at Turkish hospitals in 2019 within the scope of health tourism, with around 60% of the income being obtained from plastic surgeries.

Largest companies

Koç Holding, Sabancı Holding, Anadolu Group, Eczacıbaşı Holding and Zorlu Holding are among the country's largest industrial conglomerates, with business operations in a multitude of different sectors.

In 2014, 12 Turkish companies were listed in the Forbes Global 2000 list - an annual ranking of the top 2000 public companies in the world by Forbes magazine. Banking industry leads with 5 companies in the list followed by telecommunication industry which has 2 companies in the list. There are also 2 conglomerates followed by transportation and beverages industries with 1 companies each. As of 2014, listed companies were:

Long term GDP forecasts 

The following table is an OECD Long Term Projections made in February 2022 for largest 16 economies by GDP using PPP exchange rates from 2030 to 2060.

External trade and investment

As of 2016, the main trading partners of Turkey are Germany, Russia and the United Kingdom, UAE, Iraq, Italy and China, many being top in both export as well as import. Turkey has taken advantage of a customs union with the European Union, signed in 1995, to increase industrial production for exports, while benefiting from EU-origin foreign investment into the country. In addition to Customs Union, Turkey has free-trade agreements with 22 countries.

A very large aspect of Turkey trade revolves around the automotive industry, where its top exports are cars, accounting for $13.2 billion. Other top exports from the country are gold, delivery trucks, vehicle parts and jewelry, which are respectively, $6.96 billion, $5.04 billion, $4.64 billion, and $3.39 billion. These values are calculated using the 1992 revision of the Harmonized System classification. Comparatively, it imports many of the same industries, such as, gold valued at $17.1 billion, refined petroleum at $9.8 billion, cars at $8.78 billion, vehicle parts at $6.34 billion and scrap iron at $5.84 billion.

Turkey is also a source of foreign direct investment in central and eastern Europe and the CIS, with more than $1.5 billion invested. 32% has been invested in Russia, primarily in the natural resources and construction sector, and 46% in Turkey's Black Sea neighbours, Bulgaria and Romania. Turkish companies also have sizable FDI stocks in Poland, at about $100 million.

The construction and contracting companies, such as Enka, Rönesans Holding and Tekfen, have been significant players in the country's economy.

Without a carbon price exporters to the EU will have to pay the CBAM from 2026.

Turkey had many improvements in the ease of doing business index. Its rank increased from 68th in 2017 to 33th in 2020. As of 2021, it was performing better than countries like the Netherlands and Belgium.

Natural resources

Energy

The energy sector is the main source of greenhouse gas emissions by Turkey and contributes to climate change in Turkey, which is in turn affecting the economy by increasing droughts, which reduce agriculture and hydropower in Turkey. By 2020, according to Carbon Tracker, both new wind and solar power were cheaper than building new coal power plants; and they forecast that wind would become cheaper than existing coal plants in 2027, and solar in 2023: so they say that constructing Afşin-Elbistan C power station would be a waste of money (estimated 17 billion lira).

By the end of the 2010s Turkey had achieved energy security - in part by increasing regasification capacity and gas storage capacity. Coal power subsidies have been described as economically irrational, for increasing air pollution.

Renewable energy

Fossil fuels

Gas

Oil
Turkey is an oil producer, but the level of production by the state-owned TPAO is not nearly enough to make the country self-sufficient, which makes Turkey a net importer of oil. The Energy Market Regulatory Authority sets a ceiling on gasoline and diesel prices.

The Baku–Tbilisi–Ceyhan pipeline, the second-longest oil pipeline in the world, was inaugurated on 10 May 2005. The pipeline delivers crude oil from the Caspian Sea basin to the port of Ceyhan on Turkey's Mediterranean coast, from where it is distributed with oil tankers to the world's markets.

Coal

Minerals

Turkey is the tenth-ranked producer of minerals in the world in terms of diversity. Around 60 different minerals are currently produced in Turkey. The richest mineral deposits in the country are boron salts, Turkey's reserves amount to 72% of the world's total. According to the CIA World Factbook, other natural resources include coal, iron ore, copper, chromium, uranium, antimony, mercury, gold, silver, barite, borate, celestine (strontium), emery, feldspar, limestone, magnesite, marble, perlite, pumice, pyrites (sulfur) and clay.

In 2019, the country was the 2nd largest world producer of chromium; the world's largest producer of boron; 6th largest world producer of antimony; 9th largest world producer of lead; 13th largest world producer of iron ore; 11th largest world producer of molybdenum; 4th largest world producer of gypsum; 15th largest world producer of graphite; in addition to being the 11th largest world producer of salt.

As a gold producer Turkey is currently ranked 22nd globally. Hosting some of the largest gold deposits in the European continent it is currently Europe's largest gold producer, producing 42 Tonnes of gold in 2020. World class deposits include Kisladag Mine 17Moz and Copler 10Moz. The country hosts 18 mid sized deposits from 1-10Moz gold, these include the Kiziltepe Gold Mine, Salinbas, Hod Maden, Ovacik and Efemcukuru.

Environment

Almost all post-covid stimulus was detrimental to the environment, with Russia being the only worse country. In the 21st century, Turkey's fossil fuel subsidies are around 0.2% of GDP, including at least US$14 billion (US$169 per person) between January 2020 and September 2021. Data on finance for fossil fuels by state-owned banks and export credit agencies is not public.

Employment 

In 2021 trade unions complained that TurkStat data showed unemployment falling whereas that of the government employment agency showed it rising. Environmentalists argue that some actions to improve the environment would also benefit the economy, for example: that investing in wind power in Turkey and solar power in Turkey would create jobs and is competitive with fossil fuels.

Regional disparities

According to Eurostat data, Turkish GDP per capita adjusted by purchasing power standards stood at 64 percent of the EU average in 2018.

The country's wealth is mainly concentrated in the northwest and west, while the east and southeast suffer from poverty, lower economic production and higher levels of unemployment. However, in line with the rapid growth of Turkey's GDP during the first two decades of the 21st century (with brief periods of stagnation and recession), parts of Anatolia began reaching a higher economic standard. These cities are known as the Anatolian Tigers.

Richest and poorest NUTS-2 regions (GDP PPP 2017)

Source: Eurostat - ESA 95

Richest and poorest NUTS-1 regions (GDP PPP 2017)

Source: Eurostat - ESA 95

See also
 Economic history of Turkey
 World Bank
 OECD
 National debt of Turkey
World Gold Council
List of companies of Turkey
List of countries by labour force Turkey, 19th
List of countries by real GDP growth rate Turkey, 15th
List of countries by total wealth Turkey, 28th
List of countries by number of millionaires Turkey, 34th
List of countries by number of billionaires Turkey, 23rd
List of countries with the most skyscrapers Turkey, 14th

References

Works cited

External links

Invest in Turkey 
Turkey Discover the potential
OECD
Turkey Trade Statistics, World Bank

Tariffs applied by Turkey as provided by ITC's ITC Market Access Map, an online database of customs tariffs and market requirements
Green growth knowledge platform 
World Bank

 
Turkey
Turkey
Turkey